Group D may refer to:

 FIA Group D - International Formula racing cars:
 Formula Two
 Formula Three
 Formula 3000
 One of six or eight groups of four teams competing at the FIFA World Cup
 2022 FIFA World Cup Group D
 2018 FIFA World Cup Group D
 2014 FIFA World Cup Group D
 2010 FIFA World Cup Group D
 2006 FIFA World Cup Group D
 2002 FIFA World Cup Group D
 1998 FIFA World Cup Group D
 1994 FIFA World Cup Group D
 1990 FIFA World Cup Group D
 Group D Production Sports Cars, a motor racing category current in Australia from 1972 to 1981
 D Grubu, Turkish artists group founded in 1933 by Zeki Faik İzer, Nurullah Berk, Elif Naci, Cemal Tollu, Abidin Dino and Zühtü Müridoğlu.